Teddy Wilson is an Australian rugby union player who plays for the  in Super Rugby. His playing position is scrum-half.

Reference list

External links
itsrugby.co.uk profile

Australian rugby union players
Living people
Rugby union scrum-halves
New South Wales Waratahs players
Year of birth missing (living people)